Apple Creek Township is one of ten townships in Cape Girardeau County, Missouri, USA.  As of the 2000 census, its population was 1,960.

History
Apple Creek Township was founded in 1872. The township takes its name from Apple Creek.

Geography
It contains seven cemeteries: Byrd, Clippard, Dickman, Fulbright, Sides, Trinity and Wheeler.

The streams of Allie Creek, Froggy Branch, Hughes Creek, Little Apple Creek, Poor Creek, Sandy Branch, Sandy Creek and South Fork Apple Creek run through this township.

References

 USGS Geographic Names Information System (GNIS)

External links
 US-Counties.com
 City-Data.com

Townships in Cape Girardeau County, Missouri
Cape Girardeau–Jackson metropolitan area
Townships in Missouri